The men's team pursuit event in cycling at the 2000 Summer Olympics was held on Sunday, 17 September, and Monday, 18 September 2000 at the Dunc Gray Velodrome. The competition consisted of matches between two teams of four cyclists.  The teams started at opposite ends of the track. They had 16 laps (4 kilometres) in which to catch the other cyclist. If neither was caught before one had gone 16 laps, the times for the distance (based on the third rider of the team to cross the line) were used to determine the victor.

Medalists

Records

Results
 Q denotes qualification by place in heat.
 q denotes qualification by overall place.
 DNS denotes did not start.
 DNF denotes did not finish.
 DQ denotes disqualification.
 NR denotes national record.
 OR denotes Olympic record.
 WR denotes world record.
 PB denotes personal best.
 SB denotes season best.

Qualifying round
Held 18 September
For the qualifying round, teams did not face each other.  Instead, they raced the 4000 metres by themselves.  The top eight times qualified for the first competition round, with the other two teams receiving a rank based on their time in this round.

Match round- Quarter Finals
Held 18 September.
In the first round of match competition, teams were seeded into matches based on their times from the qualifying round. The fastest team faced the eighth-fastest, the second-fastest faced the third, and so forth. Winners advanced to the finals while losers in each match received a final ranking based on their time in the round.

Heat 1

Heat 2

Heat 3

Heat 4

Match round- Semi-Finals
Held 19 September.

Winners advanced to the medal round while losers in each match received a final ranking based on their time in the round.

Heat 1

Heat 2

Medal round
Held 19 September
Teams were again re-seeded, this time based on their times in the match round. The third- and fourth-fastest teams faced off in the bronze medal match, while the fastest two teams competed for the gold and silver medals.

Bronze medal match

Gold medal match

Final classification
The final classification was:

References

External links
Official Olympic Report

M
Cycling at the Summer Olympics – Men's team pursuit
Track cycling at the 2000 Summer Olympics
Men's events at the 2000 Summer Olympics